The 2017 Sport11 Ladies Open was a professional tennis tournament played on outdoor clay courts. It was the second edition of the tournament and was part of the 2017 ITF Women's Circuit. It took place in Budapest, Hungary, on 10–16 July 2017.

Singles main draw entrants

Seeds 

 1 Rankings as of 3 July 2017.

Other entrants 
The following players received a wildcard into the singles main draw:
  Ágnes Bukta
  Georgina García Pérez
  Tena Lukas
  Panna Udvardy

The following player received entry by using a protected ranking:
  Alexa Glatch

The following players received entry from the qualifying draw:
  Catalina Pella
  Nina Potočnik
  Melanie Stokke
  Anna Zaja

The following player received entry as a lucky loser:
  Chantal Škamlová

Champions

Singles

 Jana Čepelová def.  Danka Kovinić, 6–4, 6–3

Doubles
 
 Mariana Duque /  María Irigoyen def.  Aleksandra Krunić /  Nina Stojanović, 7–6(7–3), 7–5

External links 
 2017 Sport11 Ladies Open at ITFtennis.com
 Official website

2017 ITF Women's Circuit
2017 in Hungarian women's sport
 
2017 in Hungarian tennis